Jonathan Cruz Rivera (born February 23, 1984) is a Puerto Rican professional wrestler. He is currently working for the American promotion All Elite Wrestling (AEW) under the ring name Serpentico and occasionally under his real name of Jon Cruz, as well as working for Ring of Honor under the ring name Ben Dejo.

Professional wrestling career 
Cruz made his debut on AEW Dark on March 18, 2020, teaming with Matt Sells, in a loss against The Natural Nightmares (Dustin Rhodes and Q. T. Marshall). He would wrestle under various gimmicks, including Jonathan Cruz and Serpentico. On July 2, 2020, Cruz won his first match, teaming with Luther to defeat Brady Pierce & Pineapple Pete. On December 2, 2020, he made his AEW Dynamite debut, participating in the Dynamite Diamond Ring Battle Royal. On the May 27, 2022 episode of AEW Rampage, Cruz would use the ring name Jon Cruz when teaming with Taylor Rust to unsuccessfully challenge The Young Bucks.

Championships and accomplishments 
Championship Wrestling Entertainment
CWE Tag Team Championship (1 time) – with Lince Dorado
NWA Florida Underground Wrestling
NWA FUW tag team Championship (1 time) - with Jay Rios
Pro Wrestling Illustrated
 PWI ranked him #436 of the top 500 singles wrestlers in the PWI 500 in 2015 
Vintage Wrestling
Vintage Wrestling Tag Team Championship (4 times) - with Marty Con Dejo (2 times), Jay Rios (1 time) and Eddie Rios (1 time)
Ring Warriors
Ring Warriors Global Tag Team Championship (1 time) – with Eddie Rios 
Stand Alone Wrestling
PWAD Championship (1 time)

References

External links 
 
 

1984 births
All Elite Wrestling personnel
Living people
Masked wrestlers
People from Bayamón, Puerto Rico
Puerto Rican male professional wrestlers
21st-century professional wrestlers